The 5th Rhode Island Infantry Regiment was an infantry regiment in the Union Army during the American Civil War.

Service
The 5th Rhode Island Infantry Regiment was organized at Providence, Rhode Island, as a battalion of five companies and mustered in on December 16, 1861.  An additional five companies were raised afterward and mustered in on December 27, 1862.

The regiment was attached to Parke's 3rd Brigade, Burnside's Expeditionary Corps, to April 1862. 1st Brigade, 3rd Division, Department of North Carolina, to July 1862. 2nd Brigade. 1st Division, Department of North Carolina, to January 1863. 2nd Brigade, 4th Division, XVIII Corps, Department of North Carolina, to May 1863. Lee's Brigade, Defenses of New Berne, North Carolina, Department of North Carolina, to July 1863.

The 5th Rhode Island Infantry Regiment ceased to exist in July 1863 when it was reorganized as the 5th Rhode Island Heavy Artillery Regiment.

Detailed service
Burnside's Expedition to Hatteras Inlet and Roanoke Island, N.C., January 7-February 8, 1862. Battle of Roanoke Island February 9. At Roanoke Island until March 11. Expedition up Currituck Sound February 19. Advance to New Berne March 11–13. Battle of New Berne March 14. Operations against Fort Macon March 19-April 26. Moved to Havelock Station, Atlantic & North Carolina Railroad, March 19–20. Companies A, B, and C to Newport Barracks March 23, then the battalion moved to Carolina City April 4. At Bogue Banks April 6–30. Camden, South Mills, April 19. At Fort Macon April 30-June 30. At Beaufort, N.C., until August 7, and at New Berne until December. Expedition to Tarboro November 2–12. Rawle's Mills November 2. Demonstration on New Berne November 11. Foster's Expedition to Goldsboro December 11–20. Kinston December 14. Whitehall December 16. Goldsboro December 17. Duty at New Berne until May 1863. Expedition to relief of Little Washington April 7–10. Duty in the defenses of New Berne until July.

Casualties
The regiment lost a total of 119 men during service (this includes casualties after it was changed to heavy artillery); 1 officer and 8 enlisted men killed or mortally wounded, 4 officers and 106 enlisted men died of disease.

See also

 List of Rhode Island Civil War units
 Rhode Island in the American Civil War

References
 Barney, C. H.  A Country Boy's First Three Months in the Army (Providence, RI:  N. B. Williams & Co.), 1880.
 
 Dyer, Frederick H. A Compendium of the War of the Rebellion (Des Moines, IA:  Dyer Pub. Co.), 1908.
Attribution
 

Military units and formations established in 1861
Military units and formations disestablished in 1863
5th Rhode Island Infantry
1861 establishments in Rhode Island